The Alabama State Hornets basketball team is the men's basketball team that represents Alabama State University in Montgomery, Alabama, United States.  The school's team currently competes in the Southwestern Athletic Conference.

AAMU basketball rivalry
The Alabama State-AAMU basketball rivalry is annually the highest attended and most anticipated series for both schools.

Postseason results
In seven total postseason appearances the Hornets are yet to win a game.

NCAA tournament results
The Hornets have appeared in the NCAA tournament four times. Their record is 0–4.

NIT results
The Hornets have appeared in the National Invitation Tournament (NIT) two times. Their record is 0–2.

CIT results
The Hornets have appeared in one CollegeInsider.com Postseason Tournament (CIT). Their record is 0–1.

Notable players
 Lewis Jackson, forward 1980–1984, #33 Jersey Retired, SWAC Hall Of Fame 
 Steve Rogers, forward 1989–1992, NBA draft 1992 / Round: 2 / Pick: 40th overall
 Tauheed Epps, forward 1995–1997, more commonly by the stage name 2 Chainz

References

External links